The German Class 99.73-76 engines were standard locomotives (Einheitslokomotiven) in service with the Deutsche Reichsbahn for Saxony's narrow gauge railways. Together with their follow-on class, the DR Class 99.77-79, they were the most powerful narrow gauge locomotives in Germany for the  track gauge.

History 
Although there was already a very powerful locomotive for operations on the mountain lines in the Ore Mountains (Erzgebirge) of eastern Germany in the shape of the ten-coupled ex-Saxon Class 99.67-71, there was a further requirement for an even more powerful class. So it fell to the newly formed Reichsbahn railway division of Dresden to procured an Einheitslok with a  track gauge. The Standardisation Office of the German Locomotive Union in Berlin-Tegel prepared the design for this class.

The first series of 13 locomotives was built by the Sächsische Maschinenfabrik, previously Richard Hartmann, in Chemnitz. According to the supply agreement, the Sächsische Maschinenfabrik was supposed to deliver more locos, but as a result of its bankruptcy and liquidation in 1930, this order was transferred to the Berliner Maschinenbau AG (BMAG), previously Schwartzkopff. In 1928, seven locomotives were supplied by BMAG and another twelve followed in 1933.

The locomotives were very modern for their time, and were similar in design to the standard gauge Einheitslokomotiven. The engines fulfilled expectations; by double-heading it was now possible to haul even very long (up to 56 axles) narrow gauge trains uphill.

In 1945, ten locomotives had to be given to the Soviet Union as war reparations. At the same time, there was an enormous increase in the transportation required in the Erzgebirge mountains as a result of new uranium mines opened by 
SDAG Wismut. In 1952, in order to assist with the resulting shortage of locomotives, a similar follow-on class emerged, DR Class 99.77-79, built by the VEB Lokomotivbau Karl Marx in Babelsberg. At the end of the 1960s, the first Class 99.73-76 engines had to be retired due to boiler damage. Ten locomotives were given new, welded boilers and continued to work their original routes. In 1992, number 99 1760 was converted to oil-firing.

Technical features 
These ten-coupled locomotives had carrying axles housed in a Bissel bogie. The fixed third axle acted as the driving axle and had thinner wheel flanges to begin with. After 1945 its flanges were removed entirely to improve curve running still further.

As was typical on all Einheitslokomotiven, the engine had a Knorr feedwater preheater mounted transversely above the smokebox. The boiler was fed using Friedmann exhaust steam injectors.

Because Heberlein brakes were still partially in use at that time, the locomotives also had, on delivery, the necessary equipment for them, complete with guide rollers and winders (Haspel). The locomotive itself had a Knorr compressed-air brake which was controlled by the vacuum brake used for the train.

As the first engines were delivered in 1928, it was already planned to replace the obsolete funnel couplers by Scharfenberg couplers. So the first locomotives still had funnel couplers to begin; these were later swapped for the new couplings without any difficulty.

Operations 
At the outset single locomotives were even used in the Thumer Netz and in Wilsdruff. On the hilly routes of Hainsberg–Kipsdorf, Cranzahl–Oberwiesenthal and Zittau–Oybin/Jonsdorf, however, these powerful engines soon became the main prime movers.

Today the Class 99.73-76 locomotives are stationed in Zittau and Freital-Hainsberg. One engine has also been on duty on the Lößnitzgrund Railway since the closure of the Weisseritz Valley Railway due to flooding (as at 03/2007).

See also
 List of DRG locomotives and railbuses

Sources 
 
 
 

99.073
2-10-2T locomotives
99.73-76
Railway locomotives introduced in 1928
750 mm gauge locomotives
Sächsische Maschinenfabrik locomotives
Berliner locomotives
1′E1′ h2t locomotives